The Deansgate electoral ward of Manchester City Council was created by the Local Government Boundary Commission for England  to replace part of the City Centre ward in 2018.

Different parts of this ward are represented by different MPs; the majority of the ward is in the Manchester Central constituency but the area north of the railway line through Victoria station is in the Blackley and Broughton constituency.

Councillors 
Three councillors serve the ward: William Jeavons, Labour (2019–23), Marcus Johns, Labour (2021–24), and Joan Davies, Labour (2018–22).

 indicates seat up for election.

Elections in 2020s  
* denotes incumbent councillor seeking re-election.

May 2021

Elections in 2010s

May 2019

May 2018

References



Manchester City Council Wards